Rhodora J. Donahue Academy of Ave Maria is a private, Roman Catholic K-12 school in Ave Maria, Florida.  Founded as Ave Maria Grammar and Preparatory School, it was initially independent of the Diocese of Venice, Florida. On May 12, 2017, the Diocese of Venice in Florida announced its plan to purchase Rhodora J. Donahue Academy and convert it into a Diocesan Parochial School.  Documentation of the transfer was recorded with the Collier County Clerk's office on July 6, 2017. The school has been listed on the Catholic Education Honor Roll as a School of Excellence. The founding headmaster in 2007 was Dr. Daniel Guernsey, who left the academy in 2013 to head up the Education program at Ave Maria University, and who was hired by the diocese in 2017 to return to the academy as its principal.

History
The school was established in 2007 as the Ave Maria Grammar and Preparatory School.

Athletics
The sports teams are nicknamed the "Shamrocks."

Sports offered are 8-man football, basketball, baseball, cross country, track, softball, volleyball, and soccer.

In 2016, the Donahue Academy Shamrocks had a record of 11 wins and zero losses, winning the 2016 Florida FCAPPS 8-man Football State Championship Title game.

Shakespeare Program
One of the hallmarks of Donahue Academy has been the Shakespeare program founded in 2015 by Peter Atkinson, a graduate of Ave Maria University. Atkinson's performance model was based on his experience as a performer in Ave Maria University's Shakespeare in Performance program. His teaching model was based on that of Shakespeare & Company. In 2017, Atkinson left his teaching position to pursue further education at Columbia University. Robert Gotschall, another former member of the Shakespeare in Performance program, who had previously taught at Mason Classical Academy in Naples, took charge of the program.

Productions:
 2016: Romeo and Juliet
 2017: As You Like It
2018: A Midsummer Night's Performance

Notes and references

External links
 School Website

Catholic secondary schools in Florida
Roman Catholic Diocese of Venice in Florida
Educational institutions established in 2007
High schools in Collier County, Florida
2007 establishments in Florida